DXJT (99.3 FM), simply known on-air as 99.3 FM, is a radio station owned and operated by the Joint Task Force Sulu. The station's studio is located in Camp Asturias, Brgy. Asturias, Jolo, Sulu.

References

Radio stations in Sulu
Radio stations established in 2017